The Commandant of the United States Army Command and General Staff College is the highest-ranking official at the United States Army's Fort Leavenworth, Kansas, installation. The position is similar to the West Point Superintendent and is roughly equivalent to the chancellor or president of an American civilian university. Since 1976, the commandant has been a Lieutenant General (three stars) and is also in charge of the United States Army Combined Arms Center which includes other training organizations at Fort Leavenworth.

The General Staff College, which is a graduate school, trains a high number of United States Army field officers, many of whom go on to become general officers. The college is part of the United States Army Training and Doctrine Command.

List of commandants
The college has the following list of commandants. There were also breaks during the Spanish–American War and World War I.

School of Application for Cavalry and Infantry
COL Elwell Stephen Otis November 1881  June 1885
COL Thomas H. Ruger June 1885  May 1886
United States Infantry and Cavalry School
COL Alexander McDowell McCook May 1886  August 1890 
COL Edwin F. Townsend August 1890  October 1894
COL Hamilton S. Hawkins October 1894  April 1898 (closed during Spanish–American War)
General Service and Staff College
COL Charles W. Miner September 1902  June 1903
United States Infantry and Cavalry School
BG John Franklin Bell July 1903  June 1906 
Army School of the Line
BG Charles Badger Hall August 1906  April 1908
MAJ John Frank Morrison (Acting) AprilAugust 1908
BG Frederick Funston August 1908  January 1911
BG Ramsay D. Potts January 1911  February 1913
LTC William P. Burnham (Acting) February 1913  August 1914
BG Henry Alexander Greene September 1914  August 1916
BG Eben Swift August 1916  November 1916 (officer training closed during World War I although other training took place)
LTC James W. McAndrew November 1916  June 1917
LTC Charles H. Miller JuneJuly 1917
COL William A. Shunk July 1917  July 1919
MG Charles Henry Muir July 1919  August 1920
COL Lucius Roy Holbrook AugustSeptember 1920
BG Hugh Aloysius Drum September 1920  July 1921
BG Hanson Edward Ely August 1921  June 1923
BG Harry A. Smith July 1923  June 1925
Command and General Staff School
BG Edward Leonard King July 1925  July 1929
MG Stuart Heintzelman July 1929  February 1935
MG Herbert J. Brees February 1935  June 1936
BG Charles Michael Bundel June 1936  March 1939
BG Lesley J. McNair April 1939  October 1940
BG Edmund L. Gruber October 1940  May 1941
BG Horace H. Fuller JuneNovember 1941
COL Converse R. Lewis (Acting) November 1941  March 1942
MG Karl Truesdell March 1942  November 1945
Command and General Staff College
LTG Leonard T. Gerow November 1945  January 1948
LTG Manton S. Eddy January 1948  July 1950
BG Harlan N. Hartness (Acting) JulyOctober 1950
MG Horace L. McBride October 1950  March 1952
MG Henry I. Hodes March 1952  March 1954
BG Charles E. Beauchamp (Acting) MarchJuly 1954
MG Garrison Holt Davidson July 1954  July 1956
MG Lionel C. McGarr July 1956  August 1960
MG Harold K. Johnson August 1960  February 1963
MG Harry Jacob Lemley, Jr. February 1963  August 1966
MG Michael S. Davison August 1966  September 1968
MG John Hancock Hay September 1968  1971 (3)
MG John J. Hennessey 1971  July/August 1973
MG John H. Cushman 1 Jul 1973 – February 1976
MG Morris J. Brady (Acting) FebruaryNovember 1976
LTG John R. Thurman III November 1976  30 Sep 1979
LTG William Reed Richardson 9 Oct 1979  23 Aug 1981
LTG Howard F. Stone 24 Aug 1981  25 Jun 1982
LTG Jack W. "Neil" Merritt 26 Jun 1982  6 Jun 1983
LTG Carl E. Vuono 24 Jun 1983  9 Jun 1985
LTG Robert W. RisCassi 10 Jun 1985  9 Jun 1986
LTG Gerald T. Bartlett 10 Jun 1986  13 Jul 1988
LTG Leonard P. Wishart III 14 Jul 1988  15 Aug 1991
LTG Wilson Allen Shoffner 16 Aug 1991 – 27 Jul 1993
LTG John E. Miller 27 Jul 1993 – 19 Jul 1995
LTG Leonard D. Holder, Jr. 19 Jul 1995 – 7 Aug 1997
LTG Montgomery C. Meigs 7 Aug 1997  22 Oct 1998
LTG William M. Steele 23 Oct 1998 – 25 Jul 2001
LTG James C. Riley 26 Jul 2001 – 25 Jun 2003
LTG William Scott Wallace 13 Jul 2003 – 19 Oct 2005
LTG David H. Petraeus 20 Oct 2005 – 2 Feb 2007
LTG William B. Caldwell IV 11 Jun 2007  November 2009
LTG Robert L. Caslen March 2010  July 2011
LTG David G. Perkins November 2011  February 2014
LTG Robert B. Brown February 2014  April 2016
BG John S. Kem (interim) April 2016  June 2016
LTG Michael D. Lundy June 2016  December 2019
LTG James E. Rainey December 2019  May 2021
LTG Theodore D. Martin May 2021  October 2022
LTG Milford H. Beagle Jr. October 2022  present

See also
 List of lists of people from Kansas

References

Command and General Staff College
United States Army Command and General Staff College
Commandant of the United States Army Command
Command and General Staff College